Libor Hrdlička (born 2 January 1986) is a Slovak professional footballer.

Career
He notably for the played for Corgoň Liga club Ružomberok, Ukrainian Premier League club Metalurh Zaporizhya and multiple-time Georgian champion Dinamo Tbilisi.

In January 2021, he joined Žiar nad Hronom-based club FK Pohronie to cover for Tomáš Jenčo. Immediately, however, he became the preferred goalkeeper and after keeping a clean sheet in 7 of 14 league appearances, he contributed to Pohronie's efforts in avoiding relegation. He parted from the club in January 2022.

References

External links
MFK Ružomberok profile

FC Dinamo Tbilisi official Profile

1986 births
Living people
Footballers from Bratislava
Slovak footballers
Slovakia youth international footballers
Slovak expatriate footballers
Association football goalkeepers
FC Zbrojovka Brno players
MFK Ružomberok players
FC Metalurh Zaporizhzhia players
FC Dinamo Tbilisi players
Ruch Chorzów players
AS Trenčín players
FK Inter Bratislava players
MFK Karviná players
FC Petržalka players
FK Pohronie players
Czech First League players
Slovak Super Liga players
Ukrainian Premier League players
Ekstraklasa players
I liga players
Erovnuli Liga players
2. Liga (Slovakia) players
Expatriate footballers in Ukraine
Expatriate footballers in the Czech Republic
Expatriate footballers in Poland
Expatriate footballers in Georgia (country)
Expatriate footballers in Austria
Slovak expatriate sportspeople in Ukraine
Slovak expatriate sportspeople in Georgia (country)
Slovak expatriate sportspeople in the Czech Republic
Slovak expatriate sportspeople in Poland
Slovak expatriate sportspeople in Austria